Muhammad bin Mohd Faudzi (born 27 February 1996) is a Malaysian professional footballer who plays as a centre-back for Malaysia Super League club Kuala Lumpur City.

Career statistics

Club

Honours
Kuala Lumpur City
 AFC Cup runner-up: 2022

References

External links
 

1996 births
Living people
Malaysian footballers
People from Perak
Terengganu F.C. II players
Terengganu FC players
Kuala Lumpur City F.C. players
Malaysia Super League players
Malaysian people of Malay descent
Association football defenders